The Government of the Spanish Republic in exile was a continuation, in exile, of the government of the Second Spanish Republic following the victory of Francisco Franco's forces in the Spanish Civil War. It existed until the restoration of parliamentary democracy in 1977.

History 

Following the fall of the Republic in April 1939, the President of Spain, Manuel Azaña) and the Prime Minister, Juan Negrín, went into exile in France. Azaña resigned his post and died in November 1940. He was succeeded as President by Diego Martínez Barrio, who had been Prime Minister in 1936. Following the Occupation of France, the government was reconstituted in Mexico, which under the left-wing President Lázaro Cárdenas continued to recognise the Republic, although Negrín spent the war years in London. Negrín resigned as Prime Minister in 1945 and was succeeded by José Giral.

Until 1945, the exiled Republicans had high hopes that at the end of World War II in Europe, Franco's regime would be removed from power by the victorious Allies and that they would be able to return to Spain. When these hopes were disappointed, the government-in-exile faded away to a purely symbolic role. The government moved back to Paris in 1946. There was also a Basque government in exile and a Catalan government in exile.

In the immediate postwar period, it had diplomatic relations with Mexico, Panama, Guatemala, Venezuela, Poland, Czechoslovakia, Hungary, Yugoslavia, Romania, and Albania, but the United States, the United Kingdom, France and the Soviet Union did not recognise it.

Following Franco's death in 1975, King Juan Carlos initiated a transition to democracy. In 1977, the exiled Republicans accepted the re-establishment of the monarchy and recognised Juan Carlos's government as the legitimate government of Spain. The key moment came when Socialist leaders Felipe González and Javier Solana met Juan Carlos at Zarzuela Palace in Madrid — a tacit endorsement of the monarchy by the previously staunchly republican Socialists.

On 1 July 1977, the Government of the Spanish Republic was formally dissolved. In a gesture of reconciliation, Juan Carlos received the exiled leaders at a ceremony in Madrid.

Presidents in exile

Prime Ministers in exile

See also 

Spanish Maquis
Republicanism in Spain
Dates of establishment of diplomatic relations with Francoist Spain

References

External links
Javier Rubio, Los reconocimientos diplomáticos del Gobierno de la República española en el exilio

Former governments in exile
Governments in exile during World War II
Republicanism in Spain
Political history of Spain
1939 establishments in Spain
1977 disestablishments in Spain
Second Spanish Republic
Anti-Francoism